"This Is the House That Jack Built" is a popular English nursery rhyme and cumulative tale. It has a Roud Folk Song Index number of 20854.  It is Aarne–Thompson–Uther Index type 2035.

Lyrics
This is perhaps the most common set of modern lyrics:

This is the house that Jack built.

This is the malt that lay in the house that Jack built.

This is the rat that ate the malt
That lay in the house that Jack built.

This is the cat
That killed the rat that ate the malt 
That lay in the house that Jack built.

This is the dog that worried the cat
That killed the rat that ate the malt
That lay in the house that Jack built.

This is the cow with the crumpled horn
That tossed the dog that worried the cat
That killed the rat that ate the malt
That lay in the house that Jack built.

This is the maiden all forlorn
That milked the cow with the crumpled horn
That tossed the dog that worried the cat
That killed the rat that ate the malt
That lay in the house that Jack built.

This is the man all tattered and torn
That kissed the maiden all forlorn
That milked the cow with the crumpled horn
That tossed the dog that worried the cat
That killed the rat that ate the malt
That lay in the house that Jack built.

This is the priest all shaven and shorn
That married the man all tattered and torn
That kissed the maiden all forlorn
That milked the cow with the crumpled horn
That tossed the dog that worried the cat
That killed the rat that ate the malt
That lay in the house that Jack built.

This is the cock that crowed in the morn
That woke the priest all shaven and shorn
That married the man all tattered and torn
That kissed the maiden all forlorn
That milked the cow with the crumpled horn
That tossed the dog that worried the cat
That killed the rat that ate the malt
That lay in the house that Jack built.

This is the farmer sowing his corn
That kept the cock that crowed in the morn
That woke the priest all shaven and shorn
That married the man all tattered and torn
That kissed the maiden all forlorn
That milked the cow with the crumpled horn
That tossed the dog that worried the cat
That killed the rat that ate the malt
That lay in the house that Jack built.

This is the horse and the hound and the horn
That belonged to the farmer sowing his corn
That kept the cock that crowed in the morn
That woke the priest all shaven and shorn
That married the man all tattered and torn
That kissed the maiden all forlorn
That milked the cow with the crumpled horn
That tossed the dog that worried the cat
That killed the rat that ate the malt
That lay in the house that Jack built.

Variations
Some versions use "cheese" instead of "malt", "judge" instead of "priest", "rooster" instead of "cock", the archaic past tense form "crew" instead of "crowed", "shook" instead of "tossed", or "chased" in place of "killed". Also in some versions the horse, the hound, and the horn are left out and the rhyme ends with the farmer.

Translations
 The rhyme was translated into Dutch by Annie M.G. Schmidt as Het huis dat Japie heeft gebouwd (literally: "The house that Japie (has) built").
 A spanish translation also exists.

Narrative technique

It is a cumulative tale that does not tell the story of Jack's house, or even of Jack who built the house, but instead shows how the house is indirectly linked to other things and people, and through this method tells the story of "The man all tattered and torn", and the "Maiden all forlorn", as well as other smaller events, showing how these are interlinked.

Origins
It has been argued that the rhyme is derived from an Aramaic (Jewish) hymn Chad Gadya (lit., "One Young Goat") in Sepher Haggadah, first printed in 1590; but although this is an early cumulative tale that may have inspired the form, the lyrics bear little relationship. It was suggested by James Orchard Halliwell that the reference to the "priest all shaven and shorn" indicates that the English version is probably very old, presumably as far back as the mid-sixteenth century. There is a possible reference to the song in The Boston New Letter of 12 April 1739 and the line: "This is the man all forlorn, &c". However, it did not appear in print until it was included in Nurse Truelove's New-Year's-Gift, or the Book of Books for Children, printed in London in 1755. It was printed in numerous collections in the late eighteenth and early nineteenth centuries.

Randolph Caldecott produced an illustrated version in 1878 which proved to be extremely popular. Many of the scenes in his pictures are of northern Shropshire where he spent his youth. Cherrington Manor, a timber-framed house in North East Shropshire, with a malt house in the grounds, is believed locally to have inspired Caldecott's depiction of the House that Jack built, although the Ralph Caldecott Society states that Brook House Farm in Hamner is more likely.

Syntactic structure
Each sentence in the story is an example of an increasingly deeply nested relative clause.  The last version, "This is the horse...", would be quite difficult to untangle if the previous ones were not present.  See the Noun Phrase for more details about postmodification of the noun phrase in this manner.

References in popular culture

The rhyme continues to be a popular choice for illustrated children's books, with recent examples by Simms Taback and Quentin Blake showing how illustrators can introduce a fresh angle and humour into a familiar tale. During California's shelter in place order in response to the COVID-19 pandemic, Freeman Ng created The House We Sheltered In, a picture book that could be freely downloaded and printed out on home printers. The popularity of the rhyme can be seen in its use in a variety of other cultural contexts, including:

In literature and journalism
Samuel Taylor Coleridge used it as the basis of a self-parody published in 1797 under the name Nehemiah Higginbotham.  This was one of three sonnets, the other two parodying Charles Lamb and Charles Lloyd. Beginning "And this reft house is that the which he built / Lamented Jack!  And here his malt he piled / Cautious in vain!" it piled together phrases from Coleridge's serious work put to ludicrous use.
The poem "Château Jackson" by Irish poet Louis MacNeice, in The Burning Perch collection, is a reinterpretation based on the same cumulative process. It starts with "Where is the Jack that built the house".
The news stories in 2006 about the shady dealings of lobbyist Jack Abramoff led to editorials about "the house that Jack built".
In the graphic novel From Hell by Alan Moore, Inspector Frederick Abberline refers to his house as "the house Jack built" noting the role of Jack the Ripper in financing his home.
Mystery author Ed McBain published one of his "Matthew Hope" novels with the name The House that Jack Built in 1988. Practically every character had a corresponding counterpart to one in the original poem – an unpleasant heavyset older woman with a faulty hearing aid represented "the cow with the crumpled horn," for example.
Mentioned in A Tale of Two Cities by Charles Dickens ("A Hand at Cards", Book the Third, Ch. VIII)

Elizabeth Bishop uses the same structure in her poem "Visits to St. Elizabeths", about visiting Ezra Pound in the "huge government insane asylum in Washington". The poem begins "This is the house of Bedlam".

In politics
One of the "Political Miscellanies" associated with the Rolliad, an eighteenth-century British satire, was "This Is the House That George Built", referring to George Nugent Grenville, Marquess of Buckingham, who had briefly supported William Pitt the Younger into government before resigning from office. The parody is attributed to Joseph Richardson.
Thomas Jefferson, prior to serving as president, first used it to criticize the broad construction approach of the Necessary and Proper Clause of the U.S. Constitution with respect to a bill to grant a federal charter to a mining company. The term was used to suggest that the expansion of federal powers under these arguments would give the federal government infinite powers.  "Congress are authorized to defend the nation. Ships are necessary for defense; copper is necessary for ships; mines, necessary for copper; a company necessary to work the mines; and who can doubt this reasoning who has ever played at 'This is the House that Jack Built'? Under such a process of filiation of necessities the sweeping clause makes clean work."
A British Radical satire, published in 1819 in response to public outrage over the Peterloo Massacre, was "The Political House That Jack Built," written by William Hone and illustrated by George Cruikshank.
In 1863, David Claypoole Johnston published a cartoon "The House that Jeff Built", a satirical denunciation of Jefferson Davis, slavery, and the Confederacy.
During World War I, British Propaganda promoted the following version of the rhyme:
This is the house that Jack built.
This is the bomb that fell on the house that Jack built.
This is the Hun who dropped the bomb that fell on the house that Jack built.
This is the gun that killed the Hun who dropped the bomb that fell on the house that Jack built.

In television and film
The House That Jack Built (1939) Animation, Short
Jack and Old Mac (1956) Disney Animated, Short
The Mouse that Jack Built (1959) animated short
A 1967 animated short The House That Jack Built was nominated for an Academy Award for Best Animated Short Film.
The climax of the first adventure of the British fantasy series Sapphire & Steel hinged on the recitation of the rhyme.
In Lars von Trier's The Element of Crime the prostitute Kim tells the poem to a child. Both are being kept in a cage at Frau Gerdas Whorehouse in Halbestadt.
Lars von Trier's 2018 film The House That Jack Built is alluding to this poem in the title.
In The Avengers episode titled "The House That Jack Built" (series 4, episode 23), Mrs. Peel inherited an old house from an uncle Jack, who did not exist. The house is a former asylum and a ruse by a former employee to submit her to mind games which will drive her insane.
The rhyme is recited in the Doctor Who serial The Seeds of Doom by the Fourth Doctor and companion Sarah Jane Smith to mock the villains who were trying to force information out of them.
The 1996 TV series Profiler is about the investigation of a serial killer nicknamed "Jack of All Trades"; the title of the 13th episode is "The House that Jack Built".
The rhyme is referenced in Roots by the character Tom Lea, during a scene in which Kizzy Kinte, daughter of main character Kunta Kinte, is molested. Lea refers to Kizzy several times as "maiden, all forlorn."
The rhyme is referenced in the season 3, episode 5 Frasier episode, Kisses Sweeter Than Wine by Frasier  when saying "I cut myself because I was shaving without water. And why was there no water? Because I had to move your chair, which gouged the floor, which made me call for Joe, who found bad pipes, who called for Cecil, who ate the cat that killed the rat that lived in the house that Frasier built!"

In music 
It is referenced in the title of the 1968 Aretha Franklin song "The House that Jack Built".
In 1976, Italian songwriter and singer Angelo Branduardi wrote and published the song "Alla fiera dell'est", track 1 from his album of the same name. The song is an adaptation of the Hebrew Passover song "Chad Gadya" and follows the same cumulative structure of "This is the House That Jack Built".
It is referenced in the 1987 Go-Betweens song "The House That Jack Kerouac Built" from their album Tallulah.
It is cited on Roger Waters's 1987 album Radio K.A.O.S., during the music named "Home".
It is referenced in the title of the 1987 house track The Jack That House Built from the British house music act Jack 'N' Chill.
It is referenced in the 1988 house music anthem "My House" produced by Fingers Inc. featuring Chuck Roberts.
Track 3 from Metallica's 1996 album Load is called "The House Jack Built"
It is the namesake of a song from Tyler Bryant & the Shakedown's 2013 album, Wild Child
The Album titled The House That Dirt Built by The Heavy is a reference to the tale.

See also

 Cumulative song
 Chad Gadya
 There Was an Old Lady Who Swallowed a Fly

References

External links
The House That Jack Built ~ Photographs of Advertising from 1897 for Dr. J. C. Ayer & Co
  (multiple versions)
The House That Jack Built Resources on the Web
The House We Sheltered In, a COVID-19 sheltering-in-place picture book, Freeman Ng, 2020
 

Jack tales
English nursery rhymes
English folk songs
English children's songs
Traditional children's songs
ATU 2000-2199